John Atkinson (December 6, 1835, Deerfield, New York - December 8, 1897, Haverstraw, New York) was a Methodist clergyman of the United States. He wrote histories of Methodism, and the hymn "We Shall Meet Beyond the River".

Biography
He became a preacher at 18 years of age and served in the ministry of the Methodist Episcopal Church. He filled pulpits in New Jersey (Newark, Jersey City); Chicago; Bay City, Michigan; and finally Haverstraw, New York; after another pass through Newark and Jersey City.

Works
Works deriving from his pastoral experience:
 The Living Way (1856)
 The Garden of Sorrows (1868)
 The Class Leader (1875)
Histories:
 Memorials of Methodism in New Jersey (1860)
 The Centennial History of American Methodism, 1784-1816 (1884)
 The History of the Wesleyan Movement in America and of the Establishment Therein of Methodism (1896)

References
 
 

1835 births
1897 deaths
American historians of religion
American Methodist clergy
19th-century Methodist ministers
19th-century American clergy